Paul Treu (born 23 July 1971 in Swellendam) is a former rugby union player and currently a coach at . He played for the South African Sevens between 1999 and 2003 and was named head coach of the side in 2004, where he remained until his resignation in 2013.

References

External links
 

1971 births
Living people
South Africa national rugby union team coaches
South Africa international rugby sevens players
Rugby sevens players at the 2002 Commonwealth Games
Commonwealth Games bronze medallists for South Africa
Commonwealth Games rugby sevens players of South Africa
People from Swellendam
Commonwealth Games medallists in rugby sevens
Medallists at the 2002 Commonwealth Games